APA International Air, Inc. was an airline based in Santo Domingo, Dominican Republic that was operational between 1980 and 2001.

History

The airline was founded in 1980 as a freight charter company, it started operations with a Douglas DC-6 from the Santo Domingo to Puerto Plata. In the mid-1990's, APA International Air focused on regular passenger flights with leased aircraft from Faucett Perú. By the end of 2001, APA International Air got into financial difficulties following the September 11 attacks.

Destinations

Fleet

APA International Air operated the following aircraft:

See also
List of defunct airlines of the Dominican Republic

References

External links

Defunct airlines of the Dominican Republic
Airlines established in 1980
Airlines disestablished in 2001